Lyen Wong is a Cuban-German fitness athlete. Since her competitive debut in 2005, she has won a number of national and international titles in the fitness and figure categories.

Biography
Lyen Wong's maternal grandparents hail from the Basque Country in Spain, while her father is of Afro-Cuban and Chinese descent. She completed her master's degree in English Literature in 1997 but sports and dance was her passion. From an early age, she played competitive volleyball and practiced Tae Kwon-Do. She started her fitness career in Cuba in 1997 right after graduation and continued her work in health and fitness in Europe in 2001, first in Madrid/Spain, in 2003, in Düsseldorf/Germany, and in 2010 in United States. She has been a certified personal trainer by the American Council on Exercise, (/https://www.acefitness.org/) since 2003. 

Lyen Wong competitive career began in 2005. Among the most important US and European titles are:

 2010: 1st place Figure NPC Southern States, USA
 2007: 2nd place German International Championship
 2006: 3rd place World Championship Spain
 2005: 1st place Miss Universe Fitness, Germany
 2005: 1st place Fitness World Contest, Austria

Lyen Wong currently lives in the United States of America where she works as a Personal Trainer and owns Peak Physique & Performance, a boutique personal training business. She is committed to help others to be functional and regain pain free quality of life. She specializes in areas such as:

 Post-orthopedic rehabilitation
 Injury prevention
 Musculoskeletal pain management
 Functional training
 Corrective exercises
 Posture correction
 Pre/Post Natal

Contest history

2010

 1st place Women's Masters Figure Overall at the NPC Southern States, Ft. Lauderdale, Florida/United States
 1st place Women's Masters Figure Over 30 at the NPC Southern States, Ft. Lauderdale, Florida/USA
 2nd place Women's Figure Open at the NPC Southern States, Ft. Lauderdale, Florida/USA

2007

 2nd place Miss Universe Fitness, NAC International, Hamburg/Germany
 2nd place Miss Fitness, Intl. German championships NAC, Ludwigsfelde/Germany
 3rd place Miss Hot Bikini at Mr. Olympia, Las Vegas/United States

2006

 3rd place N.A.B.B.A. Intl. Inc. world championships, Benidorm/Spain, Fitness Shape category
 1st place Miss Fitness, NAC German championships, Korntal/Germany

2005

 1st place Miss Universe Shape N.A.B.B.A. Intl. Inc. Aachen/Germany
 1st place Miss Fitness, Intl. German championships NAC, Salzgitter/Germany
 1st place Miss Fitness, Intl. German championships NAC, Rheinbach/Germany
 1st place Miss Fitness, Fitness World Contest, Graz/Austria
 1st place Miss Fitness, Festival del Fitness, Rimini/Italy
 2nd place Miss Fitness, German championships NAC, Schwerin/Germany
 1st place Miss Fitness, regional West German championships NAC, Rheinbach/Germany

See also

List of female fitness & figure competitors
List of notable Personal Trainers

External links
 Lyen Wong official website (English) 

Fitness and figure competitors
Living people
Basque women
1974 births
Cuban people of Chinese descent
Cuban people of Spanish descent
Cuban emigrants to Germany
German people of Chinese descent
German people of Cuban descent
German people of Spanish descent
Sportspeople from Matanzas